Reibel is a surname. Notable people with the surname include: 

Charles Reibel (1882–1966), French lawyer and politician
Earl Reibel (1930–2007), Canadian ice hockey player
Grant Reibel (born 1980), Australian rugby league footballer
Guy Reibel (born 1936), French composer

See also
Rebel (surname)